"Mr. Telephone Man" is a song by New Edition, and the second single from their eponymous second album, New Edition. Released as a single, by December 8, 1984, it was being added to the most "Hot Black" radio station playlists.

Overview
"Mr. Telephone Man" included lead vocals from Ralph Tresvant, Ricky Bell and Bobby Brown with a rap by Michael Bivins and was written by Ray Parker Jr. The song was originally recorded by teenage singer Junior Tucker, who included the song on his self-titled debut album on Geffen Records in 1983. Parker produced the original version as well as the cover by New Edition.

The single reached number 12 on the Billboard Hot 100 singles chart and was the group's third number-one single on the Black Singles chart. Mixes included the instrumental and the "Extended Version".

Track listing
1. Mr. Telephone Man (Extended Version) – 6:30
2. Mr. Telephone Man (Instrumental) – 5:40

Charts

Weekly charts

Year-end charts

See also
List of number-one R&B singles of 1985 (U.S.)

References

1984 songs
1984 singles
1985 singles
New Edition songs
Songs about telephones
Songs written by Ray Parker Jr.
Songs about telephone calls